Paulo Neil Kavuma OBE (1901–1989) was a Ugandan politician and administrator. Between 1950 and 1955 he served as katikkiro (chief minister) to the then Kabaka of Buganda, Mutesa II, playing an important role in the Kabaka crisis. He recorded his account of the events of the crisis in a book, Crisis in Buganda, 1953–55 (1979).

References 

1901 births
1989 deaths
Ugandan politicians
Katikkiros of Buganda